The Roman Catholic Vicariate Apostolic of Iles Saint Pierre et Miquelon (French: Vicariat Apostolique des Îles Saint-Pierre-et-Miquelon) was an apostolic vicariate of the Latin Church of the Roman Catholic Church in North America. The Vicariate comprised the entirety of the French dependency of Saint-Pierre and Miquelon off the south coast of Newfoundland. As an Apostolic Vicariate, it did not have a formal metropolitan.  The church was headed by vicar apostolic.

First erected as an apostolic prefecture, in 1763, after the Fall of New France, it was established as an apostolic vicariate on November 16, 1970.  At the moment of its merging with the Roman Catholic Diocese of La Rochelle and Saintes, the Vicariate had 2 parishes with a combined community of 6,300 Catholics, served by 2 religious priests, 6 female religious, and 2 male religious.

On March 1, 2018, this Vicariate was merged into the territory of the Roman Catholic Diocese of La Rochelle and Saintes, in the French département of Charente-Maritime.

History 
 1763: Established as the Apostolic Prefecture of Iles Saint Pierre and Miquelon on territory of the Saint-Pierre and Miquelon from the Roman Catholic Diocese of Quebec.
 November 16, 1970: Promoted as the Apostolic Vicariate of Iles Saint Pierre and Miquelon.
 March 1, 2018: Officially suppressed and its territory merged into the Roman Catholic Diocese of La Rochelle and Saintes.

Ordinaries
Historical Ordinaries
Girard, C.S.Sp. † (22 Jan 1766 Appointed - 1767)
Julien-François Becquet, C.S.Sp. † (28 Apr 1767 Appointed - 1775 Resigned)
de Longueville † ( 1788 Appointed - 1793 Resigned)
Ollivier † ( 1816 Appointed - 7 Sep 1842 Resigned)
M. Le Helloco † (22 Jun 1853 Appointed - 1866 Resigned)
M. Letournoux † (13 Dec 1866 Appointed - 1892 Resigned)
Christophe-Louis Légasse † ( 1899 Appointed - 6 Dec 1915 Appointed, Bishop of Oran)
Giuseppe Oster, C.S.Sp. † ( 1916 Appointed - 1922 Died)
Charles Joseph Heitz † (9 Nov 1922 Appointed - 1933 Resigned)
Raymond Henri Martin, C.S.Sp. † (23 Nov 1945 Appointed - 1966 )
François Joseph Maurer, C.S.Sp. † (17 May 1966 Appointed - 17 Feb 2000 Retired)
Lucien Prosper Ernest Fischer, C.S.Sp. (17 Feb 2000 Appointed - 19 Jun 2009 Retired)
Marie Pierre François Auguste Gaschy, C.S.Sp. (19 Jun 2009 Appointed - 1 Mar 2018 Retired)

References

External links
Vicariate Apostolic of Saint-Pierre and Miquelon. Catholic-Hierarchy.org. Retrieved 2006-07-18. 

Catholic Church in Saint Pierre and Miquelon
Apostolic vicariates
Roman Catholic dioceses in North America
Religious organizations established in 1763
Religious organizations disestablished in 2018
Roman Catholic dioceses and prelatures established in the 18th century
Former Roman Catholic dioceses in America
1763 establishments in the French colonial empire
Apostolic Vicariate